Wetterzeube is a municipality in the Burgenlandkreis district, in Saxony-Anhalt, Germany. On 1 January 2010 it absorbed the former municipalities Breitenbach and Haynsburg.

References

Municipalities in Saxony-Anhalt
Burgenlandkreis